Jungle Patrol is a 1944 Australian documentary narrated by Peter Finch, which follows eight Australian soldiers on patrol in New Guinea during World War II.

Plot
It starts with their initial deployment from Port Moresby on board a US plane called the Honeymoon Express, then covers their flight over the Owen Stanley Range and Kokoda Trail to an airstrip at Dumpu in the Ramu Valley ten miles from the frontline. The eight troops them march through the Ramu Valley to Shaggy Ridge in the Finisterre Range – which the foreword claims was the nearest point to Tokyo reached by Allied troops. Some of the film was shot under fire. En route the patrol encounters enemy fire from a Japanese machine gun crew in a bunker and enemy sniper, which the Australians kill. Then they take part in a battle to take Shaggy Ridge.

Cast
 Corporal A C Pierson
 Private F C Northcott
 Private A B Graffin
 Private M J Driver
 Corporal R A Box
 Private J H Adams
 Private E Barmby

Depiction of local people
New Guinea natives are depicted helping carry supplies for Australian soldiers and are referred to as "boongs", with narrator Peter Finch claiming, "You couldn't fight the war without the boong, the steady, patient boong".

Production
The film was made by the Australian government to demonstrate the contribution of Australia to the New Guinea campaign, which they felt had not received sufficient acknowledgement. It was shot over five weeks and was widely distributed in Australia and overseas, including in newly liberated European countries. Writer-director Tom Gurr, who worked on the film without pay, estimated it was seen by fifteen million people.

References

External links
 Complete copy of film at Imperial War Museum
Complete copy of film at Australian War Memorial
 Jungle Patrol at Australian Screen Online
 Jungle Patrol at National Film and Sound Archive

Films set in Papua New Guinea
Australian World War II propaganda films
1944 films
1940s war films
Australian documentary films
1944 documentary films